Vollenhovia is a genus of ants in the subfamily Myrmicinae.

Species

Vollenhovia amamiana Terayama & Kinomura, 1997
Vollenhovia ambitiosa Menozzi, 1925
Vollenhovia banksi Forel, 1910
Vollenhovia benzai Terayama & Kinomura, 1997
†Vollenhovia beyrichi (Mayr, 1868)
Vollenhovia brachycera Emery, 1914
Vollenhovia brevicornis (Emery, 1893)
Vollenhovia brunnea Donisthorpe, 1947
Vollenhovia butteli Forel, 1913
Vollenhovia cristata (Stitz, 1938)
Vollenhovia dentata Mann, 1919
Vollenhovia denticulata Emery, 1914
Vollenhovia duodecimalis Donisthorpe, 1948
Vollenhovia elysii Mann, 1919
Vollenhovia emeryi Wheeler, 1906
Vollenhovia escherichi Forel, 1911
Vollenhovia foveaceps Mann, 1919
Vollenhovia fridae Forel, 1913
Vollenhovia gastropunctata Bharti & Kumar, 2013
Vollenhovia hewitti Wheeler, 1919
Vollenhovia irenea (Donisthorpe, 1947)
Vollenhovia kaselela Clouse, 2007
Vollenhovia loboii Mann, 1919
Vollenhovia longicephala (Terayama & Yamane, 1991)
Vollenhovia longiceps Emery, 1893
Vollenhovia lucimandibula Wang, Zhou & Huang, 2005
Vollenhovia luctuosa (Stitz, 1938)
Vollenhovia menshen Terayama, 2009
Vollenhovia modiglianii Emery, 1900
Vollenhovia moesta (Smith, 1863)
Vollenhovia mwereka Clouse, 2007
Vollenhovia nipponica Kinomura & Yamauchi, 1992
Vollenhovia nitida (Smith, 1860)
Vollenhovia novobritainae (Donisthorpe, 1948)
Vollenhovia oblonga (Smith, 1860)
Vollenhovia okinawana Terayama & Kinomura, 1997
Vollenhovia opacinoda Forel, 1913
Vollenhovia overbecki Viehmeyer, 1916
Vollenhovia pacifica Wilson & Taylor, 1967
Vollenhovia papuana Viehmeyer, 1914
Vollenhovia penetrans (Smith, 1857)
Vollenhovia pertinax (Smith, 1861)
Vollenhovia piroskae Forel, 1912
†Vollenhovia prisca (André, 1895)
Vollenhovia punctata Viehmeyer, 1914
Vollenhovia punctatostriata Mayr, 1865
Vollenhovia pwidikidika Clouse, 2007
Vollenhovia pyrrhoria Wu & Xiao, 1989
Vollenhovia rufipes Donisthorpe, 1949
Vollenhovia rufiventris Forel, 1901
Vollenhovia sakishimana Terayama & Kinomura, 1997
Vollenhovia samoensis Mayr, 1876
Vollenhovia satoi Santschi, 1937
Vollenhovia shunfenger Terayama, 2009
Vollenhovia simoides Emery, 1897
Vollenhovia soleaferrea Donisthorpe, 1942
Vollenhovia subtilis Emery, 1887
Vollenhovia umbilicata Donisthorpe, 1941
Vollenhovia undecimalis Donisthorpe, 1948
Vollenhovia xingjun Terayama, 2009
Vollenhovia yambaru Terayama, 1999

References

External links

Myrmicinae
Ant genera